Limnophila  may refer to:
 Limnophila (fly), a crane fly genus
 Limnophila (subgenus), a subgenus in the fly taxonomy
 Limnophila (plant), an aquatic plant genus